Berline (legally incorporated as Berlin-Brandenburgisches Luftfahrtunternehmen GmbH) was a German airline that operated chartered cargo and holiday flights out of its base at Berlin Schönefeld Airport. It had approximately 90 employees.

History

Foundation
Following the failed privatization and subsequent decision by Treuhandanstalt to liquidate loss-making former East German state airline Interflug in early 1991, a group of former employees acquired five of Interflug's ageing Ilyushin Il-18 turboprop aircraft and founded Il-18 Air Cargo, an airline offering chartered freight services.

On 1 November 1991, the name was changed to Berline, and the airline commenced chartered passenger flights from Berlin-Schönefeld Airport to holiday resorts at the Mediterranean Sea, thus continuing the Interflug tradition. In 1992 and 1993, another two modern Fokker 100 airliners were added to the Berline fleet, which were leased from TAT.

Closure
After several investors withdrew and a subsequent credit freeze, Berline experienced financial problems.  On 31 March 1994, the company filed for bankruptcy and immediately ceased all flight operations. Plans to restart operations were not successful, and on 28 October of that year, Berline was officially shut down.

References

External links 

Defunct airlines of Germany
Airlines established in 1991
Airlines disestablished in 1994
Interflug
German companies established in 1991
German companies disestablished in 1994